Jean-David Legrand (born 23 February 1991) is a professional footballer who plays as a full-back for Championnat National 3 club . Born in metropolitan France, he plays for the French Guiana national team.

Club career 
Legrand began his career in the youth academy of Toulouse. He played for the club's reserve side. In 2011, he joined Trélissac.

In 2014, Legrand signed for Bergerac. He played for the club until 2016, when he joined Stade Bordelais. In 2018, Legrand joined .

International career 
Legrand made his debut for the French Guiana national team in 2014. He was included in the team's squad for the 2017 CONCACAF Gold Cup.

References 

1991 births
Living people
Sportspeople from Saint-Denis, Seine-Saint-Denis
French footballers
French Guianan footballers
French people of French Guianan descent
Association football fullbacks

Toulouse FC players
Trélissac FC players
Bergerac Périgord FC players
Stade Bordelais (football) players
Championnat National 3 players
Championnat National 2 players
French Guiana international footballers
2017 CONCACAF Gold Cup players
Footballers from Seine-Saint-Denis